Flaten Station is a railway station at the village of Flaten in Åmli municipality in Agder county, Norway. Located along the Arendalsbanen railway line, it is served by  Go-Ahead Norge. The station was opened in 1910 as part of Arendal–Åmli Line.

References

Railway stations in Agder
Railway stations on the Arendal Line
Railway stations opened in 1910
1910 establishments in Norway